Janet Mbabazi (born 26 January 1996) is a Ugandan cricketer. In July 2018, she was named in Uganda's squad for the 2018 ICC Women's World Twenty20 Qualifier tournament. She made her Women's Twenty20 International (WT20I) for Uganda against Scotland in the World Twenty20 Qualifier on 7 July 2018. In April 2019, she was named as the vice-captain of Uganda's squad for the 2019 ICC Women's Qualifier Africa tournament in Zimbabwe.

In March 2023, Mbabazi became one of the Uganda Cricket Association's first twelve women players to be awarded central contracts.

References

Further reading

External links
 

1996 births
Living people
Ugandan women cricketers
Uganda women Twenty20 International cricketers
Place of birth missing (living people)